The Philippine Sports Stadium, also known as New Era University (NEU) Stadium,  is a football and track stadium at Ciudad de Victoria, a  tourism enterprise zone in the towns of Bocaue and Santa Maria, Bulacan, Philippines. The stadium was built right next to the Philippine Arena, the world's largest indoor arena. The stadium is the largest football stadium in the Philippines with a maximum seating capacity of 20,000. Its seating capacity is about twice the seating capacity of the Rizal Memorial Stadium which has a seating capacity of 12,000.

PWP Landscape Architecture is responsible for the landscaping work on the area around the stadium dubbed as the Stadium Gardens.

In December 2016, it was reported that the track and field team of the University of the Philippines is a tenant of the stadium.

Sporting events

Football

Club
The first football match and major sporting event to be held at the Philippine Sports Stadium was between clubs Global and Yadanarbon on April 15, 2015. About 2,000 people attended the match. The Philippine-based Global defeated Yadanarbon of Myanmar, 4–1 in a group stage match at the 2015 AFC Cup. Mark Hartmann was the first football player to make a goal at the stadium scoring at the 16th minute from a penalty kick. Yan Paing was the first foreigner and football player from a foreign-based club to make a goal at the stadium scoring the lone goal for his team at the 19th minute.

International
The first full international game held in the stadium was between the Philippines and Bahrain which took place on June 11, 2015 as part of the second round of the 2018 FIFA World Cup qualifiers. The Philippines defeated Bahrain 2–1 with Misagh Bahadoran scoring his first international goal in the 50th minute which is also the first goal made for a national team side at the stadium. Javier Patiño was the other scorer for the Philippine side scoring 10 minutes later after Bahadoran's goal. 
Abdulwahab Al Malood scored a consolation goal for Bahrain in 3 minutes into extra time, becoming the first goalscorer for a foreign national team side. The match was attended by about 6,000 people.

Rugby union
The first rugby tournament held in the stadium was the 2015 Asian Rugby Championship Division 1 tournament, which hosted the teams of Kazakhstan, Sri Lanka, Singapore and the Philippines on May 6 and 9, 2015. The first rugby match was a match between Singapore and the Philippines held on May 6, with the hosts winning the match in extra time with the scoreline of 20–17. The Philippines later lost to Sri Lanka in the finals with the scoreline of 14–27.

Other events
The stadium has also been used for concerts and non-sporting events. Along with the Philippine Arena, the Philippine Sports Stadium was used as a venue for the Iglesia ni Cristo's centennial celebration event held on July 27, 2014 with the stadium filled with 20,000 people during the rites. The stadium also held concerts of local artists as part of the 2015 New Year's Countdown event.

See also
List of football stadiums in the Philippines
Philippine Arena
New Clark City Athletics Stadium
Rizal Memorial Stadium
Biñan Football Stadium
Panaad Stadium

References

Athletics (track and field) venues in the Philippines
Football venues in the Philippines
Buildings and structures in Bulacan
Sports in Bulacan
Sports venues completed in 2014
2014 establishments in the Philippines